A foil is a very thin sheet of metal, typically made by hammering or rolling. Foils are most easily made with malleable metal, such as aluminium, copper, tin, and gold. Foils usually bend under their own weight and can be torn easily. For example, aluminium foil is usually about 1/1000 inch (0.03 mm), whereas gold (more malleable than aluminium) can be made into foil only a few atoms thick, called gold leaf. Extremely thin foil is called metal leaf. Leaf tears very easily and must be picked up with special brushes.

Foil is commonly used in household applications. It is also useful in survival situations, in the form of a "space blanket", where the reflective surface reduces the degree of hypothermia caused by thermal radiation.

See also

 Aluminium foil
 Tin foil
 Gold leaf
 Metal leaf

References

Metalworking